The Diocese of Central Zambia is one of 15 dioceses within the Anglican Church of the Province of Central Africa. It came into being in 1971: the first bishop was Jack Cunningham and the current bishop is Derek Kamukwamba.

References

Anglicanism in Zambia
 
Central Zambia
Christian organizations established in 1971
1971 establishments in Zambia